The Urban Land Institute, or ULI, is a global nonprofit research and education organization with regional offices in Washington, D.C., Hong Kong, and London.  ULI advocates progressive development, conducting research, and education in topics such as sustainability, smart growth, compact development, place making, and workforce housing.

ULI was founded as the research arm of the National Association of Realtors and currently has more than 45,000 members.

ULI currently has 52 District Councils or local chapters in the Americas, as well as 7 National councils in Europe and Asia. The Institute’s Product Councils are groups of senior industry leaders. District and Product Councils that facilitate learning and sharing.

The Institute is governed by a Global Board of Directors, made up of member volunteers. The board is currently headed by the Global Chairman, CPP Investment Board managing director and global head of real estate Peter Ballon, appointed in July 2021 to succeed Owen D. Thomas, CEO of Boston Properties, who was preceded by Thomas Toomey, president and CEO of UDR. The organization is led by Global CEO Ron Pressman, who succeeded W. Edward (Ed) Walter,  former Steers Chair in Real Estate at Georgetown University’s McDonough School of Business and CEO of Host Hotels and Resorts, Inc. Prior to Walter, the institute was led by Patrick Phillips, former president of Economics Research Associates (ERA) (acquired by AECOM in late 2007).

History

1936–1949

ULI was founded during the Great Depression on December 14, 1936 as the National Real Estate Foundation for Practical Research and Education, with the intention of becoming a research and education college in real estate and "urbiculture." In 1939 the organization changed its name to the Urban Land Institute, two years after establishing its headquarters in Chicago, Illinois.

ULI held its first conference in 1941, hosted by the Massachusetts Institute of Technology in Boston. A year later, ULI established itself as an advocacy organization with the publication of "Outline for a Legislative Program to Rebuild Our Cities." That same year, the institute relocated its headquarters to Washington, DC.

In 1944, ULI's first Product Council, the Community Builder's Council, was organized focusing on suburban building issues facing post-World War II American cities. The institute's Advisory Services program was established in 1947, conducting its first panel for the city of Louisville, Kentucky.

1950–1979
The 1950s marked the establishment of the J.C. Nichols Foundation (which later evolved into the ULI Foundation) as well as the Institute's first shopping center costs study.

ULI continued to move towards becoming a more research-focused institution during the 1960s, establishing its first research program in 1960. The Institute would conduct a number of multiyear comparative land use studies and begin spreading their influence abroad by holding its first international meeting for sustaining members in Mexico City in 1965. Two years later, in 1967, the Community Builder's Council hosted ULI's first European study tour.

In 1970, the Urban Land Research Foundation (later called the ULI Foundation) was created to "help meet the rising need for an expanding more accessible body of development information." In 1979, ULI established the ULI Awards for Excellence program.

1980–1999
ULI created its regional District Council program in 1983, starting with only seven councils in various U.S. cities.

UrbanPlan, the Institute's second high school program, was created with the help of a grant award from the National Geographic Society Education Foundation. In 1992, the Institute created its first two European National Councils for the cities of London and Barcelona.

The ULI Senior Resident Fellows program was established in 1996. That same year, the first ULI Mayor's Forum was held with the intention of creating a venue for city officials and the private sector to meet and seek solutions to urban problems.

2000–Present
In 2000, the ULI Prize for Visionaries in Urban Development was established and the number of ULI District Councils grew to 39, expanding to Europe, Asia, and South America as National Councils. A year later, in 2001, ULI opened its first European office in Brussels, Belgium. That same year, the first Young Leaders group was established by the ULI Houston District Council. A majority of the other District Councils have a Young Leaders group by 2005, and ULI opened its first Canadian District Council in Toronto, Ontario that same year.

The European office relocated to London and founded the Community Action Grant program in 2004. In 2007, the ULI Terwilliger Center for Housing was created in addition to the opening of a ULI office in Hong Kong.  By 2008, ULI membership would exceed 40,000.  That same year, ULI created the ULI Daniel Rose Center for Public Leadership in Land Use along with the launch of the Urban Investment Network in Europe. In 2011, the National Building Museum announced ULI as the 2012 Honor Award recipient for its years of dedication to leadership in urban planning and developing sustainable communities.

In 2012, ULI absorbed the Greenprint Foundation (now known as ULI Greenprint), a global alliance of real estate owners and developers which uses benchmarking and knowledge sharing to help the industry cost-effectively reduce greenhouse gas emissions.

In 2014, ULI and the National League of Cities entered a partnership to jointly guide the direction and operations of the Rose Center for Public Leadership, helping expand its work and influence to a wider audience of city officials.

In 2015, ULI established the Building Healthy Places program, which focuses on intersections between health, social and racial equity and the built environment.

Programs
Since the middle of the 20th century, ULI has been hired by city governments and private land owners as consultants for tackling local real estate and development problems. These multidisciplinary teams - consisting of members with expertise in architecture, urban planning, transportation consulting, finance, and market trends - have had many of their recommendations adopted or implemented. The institute's local district councils, have provided events for government officials and private industry leaders to deliberate about future land use challenges and have also established an UrbanPlan classroom-based curriculum that been widely adopted by schools across the United States and Canada, and expanded globally.  In addition, ULI has taken part in a number of partnerships in order to provide leadership and awareness in urban development practices, including one with the World Economic Forum (WEF).

Advisory services
ULI’s first Advisory Services program was held in April 1947 in Louisville, Kentucky. It brings together experienced real estate and land use professionals to develop solutions for complex land use and real estate development projects, programs, and policies. The panels have helped sponsors find creative, practical solutions for issues such as downtown redevelopment, land management, development potential, growth management, community revitalization, brownfields redevelopment, military base reuse, workforce and affordable housing, and asset management. Panels have also provided expert and objective advice in the wake of natural and man-made disasters such as hurricanes, flood, infrastructure failures and tornados and acts of terrorism.

Some noteworthy ULI panels include its recommendations for redeveloping a four-mile stretch of downtown Los Angeles into a CleanTech Corridor and its advice on how to revitalize Denver’s 16th Street Mall. ULI's panels have also offered consultant work for post-catastrophic redevelopment, including the 2007 I-35W Mississippi River bridge collapse in Minneapolis, Minnesota as well as advise to officials on how to rebuild Lower Manhattan after the 9/11 attacks.

There has been controversy over a few of the panel's recommendations, including its 2005 post-Hurricane Katrina advice for rebuilding New Orleans. The Nation's Mike Davis said that the recommendations "reframed the historic elite desire to shrink the city's socioeconomic footprint of black poverty (and black political power) as a crusade to reduce its physical footprint to contours commensurate with public safety and a fiscally viable urban infrastructure." Others have praised panels' recommendations, seeing them as possessing a "crystal ball," as reported by the Oklahoman when looking back at the advisory report issued just months after the 1995 Oklahoma City bombing of the Alfred P. Murrah Federal Building.

UrbanPlan
UrbanPlan is a reality-based educational program of ULI, which originated with its San Francisco chapter. It was developed in partnership with high school economics teachers, land use and real estate professionals, and the Fisher Center for Real Estate and Urban Economics (FCREUE) at the University of California at Berkeley. The core of the curriculum involves the hypothetical scenario where students respond to a proposal redevelop a community. Through role play exercises of the concerned citizen and developer, and the presentation of their proposals to a mock city council made up of volunteer local real estate professionals, students learn the major issues in the urban planning process and how the desires of many stakeholders influence development decisions. Since its launch, over 52,000 high school and university students have participated in the UrbanPlan program. In 2014, the program was introduced in the United Kingdom through a partnership with the Investment Property Forum Educational Trust. It has further expanded globally since then.

Centers and Initiatives

ULI Terwilliger Center for Housing
The Terwilliger Center for Housing is a project of the Urban Land Institute made to increase production of affordable rate, workforce housing for people living near centers of employment.  It was founded with a $5 million donation from Ron Terwilliger, former chairman of Trammell Crow Residential. The Center has produced a number of reports which look at the availability of affordable housing as well as the combined transportation and housing costs of individual U.S. metro areas.  The Center has produced reports for San Francisco, Washington, D.C., and Boston.

ULI Center for Capital Markets and Real Estate
In 2009 the institute founded the ULI Center for Capital Markets and Real Estate. The center hosts an annual capital markets and real estate conference, where it convenes industry practitioners, experts and economists for two days of panel sessions. The center also publishes a semiannual Real Estate Consensus Forecast that is often cited in financial news publications. In addition, since its founding, the center has assumed responsibility for partnering with PricewaterhouseCoopers to publish its annual Emerging Trends in Real Estate report.

Randall Lewis Center for Sustainability in Real Estate 
The Randall Lewis Center for Sustainability in Real Estate, formerly known as the ULI Center for Sustainability, was launched in 2014 to promote healthy, resilient, and energy efficient development. It houses ULI’s Building Healthy Places Initiative, the Urban Resilience program, and the Greenprint Center for Building Performance. The Building Healthy Places Initiative focuses on improving the health of people and communities in development. The ULI Urban Resilience program provides ULI members, the public, and communities across the United States with information on how to be more resilient in the face of climate change and other environmental vulnerabilities.

The center was renamed in January 2022 to honor real estate developer Randall Lewis after he donated $10 million to support ULI’s sustainability programs.

ULI Greenprint Center for Building Performance
In 2012 the Greenprint Foundation transferred their activities and assets to ULI, creating the ULI Greenprint Center for Building Performance. With the merger, the new entity hopes to facilitate the reduced use of greenhouse gas emissions in the global real estate industry. The center is best known for its annual Greenprint Performance Report, a tool used by the center's members to assess their own relative progress in reducing emissions. The report uses the Greenprint Carbon Index, and is intended to provide a verifiable, transparency tool for building owners to use in benchmarking their portfolios. The center's membership has included companies such as AvalonBay; GE Capital Real Estate; GLL Real Estate Partners; Grosvenor; Hines; Jones Lang LaSalle; Prologis; Prudential Real Estate Investors; and TIAA-CREF.

Awards and competitions
The organization makes several awards annually, including the ULI Global Awards for Excellence, the ULI Hines Student Competition, the ULI Prize for Visionaries in Urban Development, the Jack Kemp Excellence in Affordable and Workforce Housing Awards, and the ULI Urban Open Spaces Awards.

ULI Prize for Visionaries in Urban Development
The ULI Prize for Visionaries in Urban Development is an annual award given to an individual (or an institution's representative) who has made a most distinguished contribution to community building globally, who has established visionary standards of excellence in the land use and development field, and whose commitment to creating the highest quality built environment had led to the betterment of our society. The prize was initially established as the J.C. Nichols Prize in 2000, by a gift of the family of influential 20th century land developer, Jesse Clyde Nichols of Kansas City, Missouri. In 2020, the prize was renamed as the ULI Prize for Visionaries in Urban Development. Global CEO of ULI, Ed Walter, commented that: “Nichols greatly influenced the design and management of suburban America and was at the forefront of professionalizing the real estate industry in the U.S. However, his use of restrictive covenants perpetuated racial segregation and discrimination, the negative impacts of which still affect some communities today. This element of the Nichols’ legacy is clearly inconsistent with our mission and values, and when viewed through a longer-term lens that better recognizes the lasting impact of these practices, mandates that the prize be renamed."

Winners receive a $100,000 prize, which continues to be funded through an endowment from the Nichols family to the ULI Foundation. Past winners of the ULI Prize for Visionaries in Urban Development include Mayor Richard M. Daley, Amanda Burden, Peter Calthorpe, and Vincent Scully, His Highness the Aga Khan, Gerald D. Hines, Robin Chase, Theaster Gates, Alejandro Aravena, and Anthony Williams.

ULI Global Awards for Excellence
According to their website, the ULI Global Awards for Excellence "recognize truly superior development efforts in the private, public, and nonprofit sectors. Winning projects represent the highest standards of achievement in the development industry—standards that ULI members deem worthy of attainment in their professional endeavors." Founded in 1979, the awards program is the centerpiece of ULI’s efforts to identify and promote best practices in all types of real estate development. The ULI Global Awards for Excellence program honors development projects from around the world.

ULI Urban Open Space Award
The ULI Urban Open Space Award recognizes a few outstanding examples of urban public open space that have both enriched the local character and revitalized their surrounding community.  The award program was established in 2009, after that year's ULI  Prize for Visionaries in Urban Development winner, Amanda Burden, donated her $100,000 prize back to ULI for the creation of the Award.  Detroit’s Campus Martius Park was the inaugural winner of the Award, receiving a $10,000 cash prize.

ULI Jack Kemp Excellence in Affordable and Workforce Housing Award
The ULI Jack Kemp Excellence in Affordable and Workforce Housing Award honors developers who demonstrate both leadership and creativity in expanding the availability of workforce housing in the United States. The awards program was established by the ULI Terwilliger Center in 2008 under the original name, the ULI/J. Ronald Terwilliger Workforce Housing Models of Excellence Awards. It was later renamed in tribute to Jack Kemp.

ULI Hines Student Competition
The ULI/Gerald D. Hines Student Urban Design Competition, or ULI Hines Student Competition, held its first cycle in 2003. The program provides graduate-level students the opportunity to compete for a $50,000 prize. To enter, a team must be composed of five students from at least three disciplines. Each year, a real, large-scale site is selected. Student teams then have two weeks to craft a comprehensive design and development plan for that site. After finalists are narrowed, the jury of interdisciplinary experts in architecture and land use then selects a winning team. Previous finalists have included student teams from the University of Pennsylvania, the University of California Berkeley, Columbia University and a joint team from North Carolina State University and UNC-Chapel Hill.

The ULI Hines Student Competition held a separate inaugural process for students in Europe in 2020.

Publications

Magazines 

 Urban Land
 Multifamily Trends
 Urban Land Green

Books 

 Mistakes We Have Made in Community Development (1945)
 The Community Builders Handbook (1947)
 The City Fights Back (1954)
 The Dollars & Cents of Shopping Centers series (1961)
 The Homes Association Handbook (1964)
 Professional Real Estate Development: The ULI Guide to Business (2003)
 Real Estate Development: Principles and Process (2007)
 Growing Cooler (2008)
 Real Estate Market Analysis: Methods and Case Studies (2009)
 ULI UK Residential Council's Build to Rent: A Best Practice Guide (2014)

Reports 

 Emerging Trends in Real Estate (annual real estate forecast)
 Infrastructure report

Organization & Events
ULI is organized as a 501(c)(3) not-for-profit organization and governed by a set of bylaws. According to ULI's website, the organization is led by staff and member volunteers, while its business and operations are under the direction of its global chairman, chief executive officer, trustees, board of directors, and an operating committee.

Councils
Since ULI is a global organization with members geographically located in various regions, major cities, and metropolitan areas, the organization provides forums at the local level. ULI refers to its local chapters as national and district councils. The local district councils host networking events, conferences, technical advisory panels, and awards programs for the area's members. In addition to these local councils, ULI have more than 50 product councils. These are cadres of ULI members, capped at 50 members each, where council members participate in closed-door information exchanges and the sharing of best practices in their specialized industry. Membership in product councils is a highly sought-after distinction and restricted to the organization's full members.

Events
Each year, ULI holds a number of industry events open to both members and non-members.  Two major annual ULI events are the Spring and Fall Meetings, which are held in various host cities across North America.  Both of these events, which attract a variety of private and public land use professionals, have become known to feature a number of high-level speakers.  Notable past ULI keynote speakers include former President Bill Clinton, former President George W. Bush, JPMorgan Chase CEO Jamie Dimon, actor Robert Redford, NBA Hall of Famer Magic Johnson, and former U.S. Federal Reserve chairman Paul Volcker.

Outside of North America, ULI’s flagship global events include the annual ULI Europe Conference, which takes place in various European cities each year, and the ULI Asia Pacific Summit, which is held in different cities across the Asia Pacific region on an annual basis.

See also 
 Real estate development
 urban planning
 green development
 architecture
 commercial real estate
 economic development
 transportation

References

External links 

Urban Land Institute Official Website
Urban Land magazine
ULI Advisory Services Program

Non-profit organizations based in Washington, D.C.
Organizations established in 1936
Urban planning organizations